Kitchen Kabaret was a 13-minute audio-animatronic show at Epcot, Walt Disney World Resort, United States located in The Land pavilion. Kitchen Kabaret was present on EPCOT's opening day, October 1, 1982.

The host, Bonnie Appetite, introduced the acts in a musical revue and comedy format that advocated healthy eating and provided a primer on the four food groups: meat, dairy, grains and fruits/vegetables.

The show was replaced in 1994 by Food Rocks.

Show description

Introduction
"Meal Time Blues" by Bonnie Appetite
Bonnie sang this at the start of the show. Looking exhausted, she had cookbooks and her hair wrapped in a bun and with her legs crossed. She explained that it was time for her to prepare a meal, and she wasn't too excited about it. The lights turned off, and the next performance began.

Act 1
"Chase Those (Meal Time) Blues Away" by Bonnie Appetite and the Kitchen Krackpots
The Kitchen Krackpots band (containers of mayonnaise, Parmesan cheese, a spinning bottle of mustard, etc.) played a boisterous ragtime intro, as Bonnie reappeared, now in entertainer or showbiz attire (tuxedo, for instance), to "Thank you all for coming to (her) kitchen." The only figure that did not feature articulated facial features was the mustard jar.

Act 2
"The Stars of the Milky Way" by Dairy Goods and his Stars of the Milky Way
Mr. Dairy Goods was  a singing milk carton who emerged from a refrigerator holding an old-fashioned radio-style floor microphone close to his mouth, crooning introductions to three dairy products: Miss Cheese, Miss Yogurt, and Miss Ice Cream - in the style of 1930s costume extravaganzas. Each of the dairy products performed a brief cameo in a stylized manner (e.g., Miss Cheese sang like Mae West, Miss Yogurt sang like a European sex kitten, and Miss Ice Cream sang like Eartha Kitt). Every time they emerged, ice cold fog poured out of the freezer. The Cheese, Yogurt and Ice Cream bore a slight resemblance to the children from "It's a Small World".

Act 3
"Boogie Woogie Bakery Boy" by The Cereal Sisters
The Cereal Sisters—Mairzy Oats, Rennie Rice, and Connie Corn—sang a parody of Boogie Woogie Bugle Boy in the style of The Andrews Sisters, accompanied by a bugle-blowing bread slice. The bread slice wore glasses and was revealed when a kitchen cabinet was opened. He would reappear from the toaster for his second solo.

Act 4
"Meat Ditties" by Hamm & Eggz
Hamm & Eggz was a vaudeville-style comic rendition of The Meat Group Can Help You Keep Strong, in which Mr. Hamm and Mr. Eggz told jokes and sang a few short ditties. At the end, Mr. Hamm got angry because of Mr. Eggz's corny jokes, and decided to split from the group to join another protein group. Eventually, their bickering got out of hand and they had to retire into the oven for a fear of total meltdown.
 Mr. Hamm: "There's plenty of good protein acts for me to work with!"
 Mr. Eggz: "Oh yeah? Like who?"
 Mr. Hamm: "Cheese, cheese is a great source of protein!"
 Mr. Eggz: "Oh, I cheddar to think about it."
 Mr. Hamm: "Beans, now there's good..."
 Mr. Eggz: "Beans! Oh nuts to you, hammy!"
 Mr. Hamm: "That's right, nuts to me! Another excellent source of protein".
There were also running gags in this part of the show. Mr. Eggz's bow moved if he was laughing, and at the end of their parts, smoke bellowed around them to keep these two from being seen moving into the ground.

Act 5
"Veggie Veggie Fruit Fruit" by Colander Combo and the Fiesta Fruit
Night sounds, Latin percussion, and low lighting set the mood for this number, as the produce (broccoli, tomatoes, bananas, etc.) began to chant "Veggie-Veggie-Fruit-Fruit! Veggie-Veggie-Fruit-Fruit!" Bonnie Appetite, now in a Carmen Miranda-style carnival outfit, and perched upon a crescent moon that descended from the ceiling, sang "I simply have to tell you that my friends who are singing are...delectable!" Here, another running gag was present. A broccoli piece said "cha cha cha!" at times while his glasses flipped off, but the glasses resumed their spot.

Finale
"Kabaret Finale" by Bonnie Appetite and cast

Bonnie Appetite and the cast sang a medley of each of their songs. All of the cast came back out, and Bonnie said good bye, before the curtains with the Kraft logo cover the stage.

Other appearances
Disney created merchandise with the Kitchen Kabaret characters, including coloring books, audio tapes / CDs, musical books, postcards and pins of the Veggie Veggie Fruit Fruit group. Even after closing of the attraction, Veggie Veggie Fruit Fruit reappeared as characters in the annual Epcot International Food and Wine Festival.

The Astuter Computer Revue and Backstage Magic in CommuniCore featured a guest appearance by Mr. Eggz highlighting how computers controlled audio-animatronic characters. An educational animated short, "Harold and his Amazing Green Plants" used slightly redesigned versions of the Colander Combo to explain how plants grow.

On August 17, 2007, Walt Disney World released a commemorative pin honoring this attraction as part of its White Glove Remember When series. Another White Glove (a part of the Retro Epcot) pin was released on July 1, 2008.

The song Veggie Veggie Fruit Fruit appeared in the spectacular Epcot Forever.

At the 2021 Destination D23 (Disney) event, the characters of Kitchen Kabaret were featured in a panel on the park specific characters at Walt Disney World. The Kitchen Kabaret was then pitted against Food Rocks in the first ever Battle of the Food Bands. In a shocking upset, Food Rocks emerged victorious. A line of exclusive merchandise featuring the Battle of the Food Bands was released at the event, including a shirt, poster, and pin.

See also
 Epcot
 Epcot attraction and entertainment history

References

External links
Complete Show:
 Kitchen Kabaret Part 1 on YouTube
 Kitchen Kabaret Part 2 on YouTube

See also
 Epcot
 Epcot attraction and entertainment history

Former Walt Disney Parks and Resorts attractions
Epcot
Audio-Animatronic attractions
Future World (Epcot)
1982 establishments in Florida
1994 disestablishments in Florida